Nethermere (St Neots) Ltd v Gardiner And Another [1984] ICR 612 is a UK labour law case in the Court of Appeal in the field of home work and vulnerable workers. Many labour and employment rights, such as unfair dismissal, in Britain depend on one's status as an "employee" rather than being "self-employed", or some other "worker". This case stands for the proposition that where "mutuality of obligation" between employers and casual or temporary workers exists to offer work and accept it, the court will find that the applicant has a "contract of employment" and is therefore an employee.

This case is also notable in that it was one of former UK Prime Minister Tony Blair's last cases conducted as a barrister. He acted for the employers. He appeared in the Employment Appeal Tribunal on behalf of the employer but his arguments to deny the workers' unfair dismissal rights were emphatically rejected in the judgment. The employers also lost in the Court of Appeal.

Facts
The applicants (Mrs Taverna and Mrs Gardiner) sewed trouser flaps part-time in the factory of Nethermere Ltd. At different times they became pregnant and had an arrangement to work from home. Each worked 5 to 7 hours a day, and for all but 8 or 12 weeks a year. They used sewing machines provided by Nethermere Ltd. Their hours varied according to the employer's needs, they were paid according to the quantity of trouser flaps they made and they were not formally obliged to accept work. There was a dispute about an entitlement to holiday pay, and when the employer refused to give them the entitlement, they claimed they had been unfairly and constructively dismissed. So the preliminary question on appeal was whether the ladies were "employees" under a "contract of employment" and therefore entitled to unfair dismissal rights under s 153 of the Employment Protection (Consolidation) Act 1978 (now s 94 Employment Rights Act 1996).

The Industrial tribunal held that there was a contract of employment, applying the test of whether the ladies could be said to be in business "on their own account". The Employment Appeal Tribunal dismissed the employer's appeal on this point, finding in favour of the ladies. The employer appealed again.

Judgment

Employment Appeals Tribunal
The judge, Tudor Evans J held that the claimants were entitled to holiday pay. He rejected "mutuality of obligation" as a criterion. However, in the Court of Appeal, "mutuality of obligation" was accepted as a precondition to a contract, but interpreted in a different way. For the later history, Carmichael v National Power plc [1999] AC 1226, Tony Blair's old pupil master, now the Lord Chancellor Derry Irvine, reconfigured "mutuality of obligation" to mean an expressed continuing duty to provide work.

Court of Appeal
In the Court of Appeal Stephenson LJ in the majority found, first, that whether a contract created a contract of service (and therefore a contract of employment) rather than a contract for services was one of fact, not of law. This has been followed in Carmichael in 1999 by the House of Lords. Stephenson LJ discussed what "mutuality of obligation" meant.

It followed that the ladies were under a contract of employment (however compare the definition of "mutuality" given in Carmichael v National Power plc, by Lord Irvine of Lairg).

Significance
The Employment Appeals Tribunal ([1983] ICR 319) before appeal to the Court of Appeal is of interest, because a future UK Prime Minister was representing the employer. A key plank of the New Labour election pledge in 1997 was to sustain labour market flexibility, which fits in with the approach of his submissions here. In essence, he was arguing that because the interpretation of a contract is one of law, and because it can only be a contract "of employment" if there is a continuing mutual obligation on each party to offer wages or work, the home workers were not employees and therefore were not under the protection of unfair dismissal rights.

See also

UK labour law
UK agency worker law
Ready Mixed Concrete (South East) Ltd v Minister of Pensions and National Insurance
O'Kelly v Trusthouse Forte plc
Carmichael v National Power plc
Aslam v Uber BV (2016) Case no: 2202550/2015

Notes

References
E McGaughey, A Casebook on Labour Law (Hart 2018) ch 3

External links
The Employment Appeal Tribunal webpage
The judgment of a subsequent leading case O'Kelly v. Trust House Forte Plc [1984] QB 90

Labour relations in the United Kingdom
United Kingdom labour case law
Court of Appeal (England and Wales) cases
1984 in case law
1984 in British law
Tony Blair
1984 in labor relations